Robert Knight papers promoted Indian self-rule and often criticized the policies of the British Raj.

Notable newspapers of Bangladesh

Notable newspapers of India

Pakistan

Daily Qaumi Bandhan (lit. "national unity") was a Bengali language newspaper published in Karachi, Sindh, Pakistan. It has the reputation of being the only main Bengali newspaper in the country that catered specifically to the large Bengali community in Pakistan. Founded in the 1940s, the newspaper was discontinued decades later due to financial reasons. It was based in the Chittagong Colony, a Bengali neighbourhood in Karachi.

United States
Akhon Samoy is a Bengali-language newspaper published from New York, United States since 2000.

United Kingdom
Janomot was founded in London and established on 21 February 1969. It is the first Bengali weekly newspaper, the first ethnic minority newspaper in Britain and the first Bengali newsweekly published outside Bangladesh.

Potrika was established in 1997. It is published every Monday for £0.50 (or for annual subscription of £82.16). It is the only broadsheet Bengali newspaper published from the UK and follows issues relating to the British Bangladeshi community, reflecting their concerns and interests.

The newspaper covers news concerning the British Bangladeshi community from the UK, Bangladesh and worldwide, including coverage of business news, sports, films, health, leisure, fashion, education and environment.

References